The Sokoke pipit (Anthus sokokensis) is a species of bird in the family Motacillidae.
It is found in Kenya and Tanzania.
Its natural habitat is subtropical or tropical moist lowland forests.
It is threatened by habitat loss. It has richly coloured upperparts, prominent pale wingbars, and a heavily streaked breast.

References

External links

BirdLife Species Factsheet.

Anthus
Birds of East Africa
Birds described in 1921
Taxonomy articles created by Polbot
Northern Zanzibar–Inhambane coastal forest mosaic